Wonder is the third mini studio album by Japanese singer Akina Nakamori. It was released on 1 June 1988 under the Warner Pioneer label. The reprinted version was published  on 17 September 1991.

Background
Wonder is her last mini album to be released under Warner Pioneer. It's also her first mini album to be released for the first time in four years. The album consists of re-recorded and re-arranged songs from her first self-produced album Fushigi along with previously unreleased track, Fushigi. The original song has been created during the production of album Fushigi, but wasn't included in the 1986 album and instead released on this album.

Nakamori performed her new song, Fushigi in her live tour Femme Fatale in 1988.

Chart performance
The album debuted at number 2 on the Oricon Album Weekly Charts, remained in top 100 chart for 10 weeks and sold over 117,600 copies.

Track listing

References

1988 EPs
Akina Nakamori albums
Japanese-language EPs
Warner Music Japan EPs
Ethereal wave EPs